A eulogy is a speech in praise of someone, typically someone that has recently died.

Eulogy or Eulogies may also refer to:

Places
Eulogy, Mississippi, a community in the United States

Film and television
 Eulogy (film) a 2004 comedy film directed by Michael Clancy
 "Eulogy", a season 2 episode of Sanctuary
 "Eulogy", a season 1 episode of the 2018 reboot of Lost in Space

Music
Eulogy Recordings, a music label specializing in hardcore punk bands
 Eulogies (band), an indie-rock band from Los Angeles
 Eulogies (Eulogies album), their 2007 self-titled debut album
Eulogies (Wolves at the Gate album), 2022 album
Eulogy, composition for viola and eight instruments by Mark-Anthony Turnage

Songs
"Eulogy", a song by Tool from Aenima
"Eulogy", a song by Saves the Day from their 2006 album Sound the Alarm
"Eulogy", a song by Gang Starr from their 2003 album The Ownerz
"Eulogy", a song by Judas Priest from their 2005 album Angel of Retribution
"Eulogy Song", a song performed by Andrew Hansen on the TV show The Chaser's War on Everything
"Eulogy", a song by Frank Turner on his 2011 album England Keep My Bones

Other uses
Eulogy Recordings, American independent record label

See also
 Eulogia